Wanlessia sedgwicki is a species of jumping spider that is endemic to northwestern Borneo.

Males have a body length of 3.2 mm. The carapace is dark yellowish brown.

Name
The species name honors Walter Sedgwick, the collector of the holotype.

Footnotes

References
  (1992): A new genus of jumping spider from Borneo with notes on the Spartaeine palp (Araneae: Salticidae). The Raffles Bulletin of Zoology 40: 9-19. PDF
  (2007): The world spider catalog, version 8.0. American Museum of Natural History.

Salticidae
Spiders described in 1992
Invertebrates of Borneo
Spiders of Asia